Renjong LRT station (SW8) is an elevated Light Rail Transit (LRT) station on the Sengkang LRT line West Loop in Anchorvale, Sengkang, Singapore, located at Sengkang East Avenue near the junction of Sengkang East Road. It was opened on 29 January 2005 together with the Punggol LRT East Loop.

Etymology

Renjong means "tall" or "to raise" in Malay. The station was named after Lorong Renjong, a former road which was located near the station.

References

External links

Railway stations in Singapore opened in 2005
LRT stations in Sengkang
Anchorvale
Light Rail Transit (Singapore) stations